Charles James Féret (born 1854 in Clerkenwell, died 1921 in Margate) was a newspaper editor and writer. He is known among historians of London as the author of an exhaustive three volume history of Fulham, published in 1900.

The son of a haberdasher of French descent, Féret was born in Clerkenwell, London. During his childhood, the family moved west to Earl's Court. After school, he joined the Civil service and worked as a clerk in the India Office. He was of a studious disposition and by 21, he had a British Museum Library reader's ticket. At 26, he was elected a Fellow of the Royal Geographical Society. While still at the India Office, and having moved to Fulham with his mother and sister some years earlier, he took up the part-time post of editor at the local paper, The Fulham Chronicle, which launched in 1888.

His thousand-page illustrated, Fulham Old and New, was well supported and was published by subscription by the Leadenhall Press in 1900.

In 1901, Féret not only left The Chronicle, but moved to Margate probably for better quality air and became an antique dealer. He never married, but adopted a young girl from an orphanage. After her death, he adopted a second daughter. He died in Margate of a heart attack.

References

1854 births
1921 deaths
British people of French descent
British newspaper editors
19th-century English historians
People from Clerkenwell
People from Fulham
People from the Royal Borough of Kensington and Chelsea
Historians of London
Fellows of the Royal Geographical Society
History of the London Borough of Hammersmith and Fulham